Victor Herrero Forcada (born 6 November 1985), known as Pulga, is a Spanish retired professional footballer who played as a central midfielder,

Club career

Spain
Born in Almassora, Province of Castellón, Valencian Community, Pulga graduated from CD Castellón's youth setup, and made his senior debut with the reserves in 2004, in the regional leagues. He played his first match as a professional on 28 August 2005, coming on as a 71st-minute substitute in a 1–0 away loss against UE Lleida in the Segunda División.

Pulga scored his first second-division goal on 11 September 2005, netting his team's in a 2–1 defeat at Xerez CD. He appeared in seven games with the main squad during the season as they narrowly avoided relegation, and signed for hometown club CE Almassora in the summer of 2007.

In July 2007, Pulga joined Logroñés CF of the Segunda División B. He subsequently resumed his career mainly in the third tier, representing Villarreal CF B, CD Toledo, UD Alzira, UB Conquense and CD Burriana.

Greece
Pulga moved abroad for the first time in his career in August 2012, signing with Football League Greece club Iraklis Psachna FC. In July of the following year, he joined Kallithea F.C. in the same league.

Kerala Blasters
In August 2014, Pulga was announced in the international draft of the inaugural season of the Indian Super League. He was drafted by Kerala Blasters FC late in that month, his first appearance in top-flight football occurring on 21 October as he started in a 2–1 away loss to Chennaiyin FC. He totalled six games over the campaign, including the defeat to ATK in the final.

Pulga remained in Kochi for the league's second year, playing nine times as his side finished last. On 29 November 2015, in their penultimate match, he scored his only goal in the second minute against FC Goa at the Jawaharlal Nehru Stadium, albeit in a 1–5 loss.

Post-retirement
In February 2018, Pulga was named president of amateurs CD Almazora in his hometown. He returned to the Indian top flight on 26 July 2019, joining his compatriot Antonio Iriondo's staff at Jamshedpur FC.

References

External links

Indian Super League profile

1985 births
Living people
People from Plana Alta
Sportspeople from the Province of Castellón
Spanish footballers
Footballers from the Valencian Community
Association football midfielders
Segunda División players
Segunda División B players
Tercera División players
Divisiones Regionales de Fútbol players
CD Castellón footballers
Logroñés CF footballers
Villarreal CF B players
CD Toledo players
UD Alzira footballers
UB Conquense footballers
CF Rayo Majadahonda players
Football League (Greece) players
Iraklis Psachna F.C. players
Kallithea F.C. players
Indian Super League players
Kerala Blasters FC players
Kerala Blasters FC draft picks
Liga 1 (Indonesia) players
Mitra Kukar players
Bolivian Primera División players
Nacional Potosí players
Spanish expatriate footballers
Expatriate footballers in Greece
Expatriate footballers in India
Expatriate footballers in Indonesia
Expatriate footballers in Bolivia
Spanish expatriate sportspeople in Greece
Spanish expatriate sportspeople in India
Spanish expatriate sportspeople in Indonesia
Spanish expatriate sportspeople in Bolivia